Vijay Kumar Mandal is an Indian politician from Bharatiya Janata Party, Bihar and a five term Member of Bihar Legislative Assembly. Mandal won the Sikti on BJP ticket in the 2015 election as well as 2020 election. He has previously contested and won from Araria in 1995 as Bihar People's Party candidate, 2000 as an Independent and 2009 by-poll as Lok Janshakti Party candidate after the seat fell vacant following the election of the then sitting MLA Pradeep Kumar Singh to Araria (Lok Sabha constituency).

References

1965 births
Living people
Bihar MLAs 2020–2025
Bharatiya Janata Party politicians from Bihar
Bihar MLAs 2015–2020
Bihar MLAs 1995–2000
Bihar MLAs 2000–2005
Bihar MLAs 2005–2010